Clisson, is a commune in the Loire-Atlantique department in the Pays de la Loire region in western France.

The town and the celebrated family of Clisson (the most famous members are Olivier IV de Clisson and Jeanne de Clisson) take their name from their stronghold. Clisson has its imposing ruins, parts of which date from the thirteenth century.

The town and castle, the château de Clisson, were destroyed in 1792 and 1793 during the War in the Vendée.

Afterwards, the sculptor François-Frédéric Lemot bought the castle, and the town was rebuilt in the early part of the 19th century according to his plans.  There are picturesque parks on the banks of the rivers. The Moine is crossed by an old gothic bridge and by a fine modern viaduct.

Population

Culture
The Hellfest music festival has taken place outside the town since 2006.

International relations

Clisson is twinned with:
 Alatri in Italy
 Cowbridge in Wales
Klettgau in Germany

See also
Église Notre Dame de Clisson
Communes of the Loire-Atlantique department

References

External links

 Communes of the Vallée de Clisson

Communes of Loire-Atlantique